Rajalakshmi School of Management (RSM) is a private business school located in Chennai, Tamil Nadu, India. Founded in 1997, it is consistently ranked as one of the best business schools in South India.

Ranking  
 Leading Business School by Dun & Bradstreet in 2011
 Best set by AVN Awards 2013 
 "A" Rated by CRISIL in December 2011
 "A+" Rated by Business India in Ranks November 2011
 3 Rank out of 92 Institutes in Anna University

Sister Concerned Institutions

References

External links 

Rajalakshmi Institutions
Business schools in Chennai
1997 establishments in Tamil Nadu
Educational institutions established in 1997